The 1997 Tajik League season was the sixth season of the top division of the Tajikistan Football Federation. 13 teams competed in the 1997 season.

Table

External links
 

Tajikistan Higher League seasons
1
Tajik
Tajik